Åse-Marie Nesse ( 29 April 1934 – 13 July 2001) was a Norwegian philologist, translator and poet.

Biography
Åse-Marie Nesse was born in Klepp, in Rogaland county, Norway. She  finished her secondary education in 1952 at Rogaland offentlege landsgymnas. She attended Oslo Teachers' College from 1953 to 1955, then worked as a school teacher before enrolling at the University of Oslo. She graduated with the cand.philol. degree in 1963, and was hired as a lecturer in Germanic studies. She was later promoted to associate professor, and retired in 2000.

She was also a translator  and for her first translation, of work by Wolfgang Hildesheimer,  she was awarded the Bastian Prize in 1967. She also won the Dobloug Prize in 1999. Her main work was translating Faust: The First Part of the Tragedy and Faust: The Second Part of the Tragedy to Nynorsk. She also translated from English, Spanish, Dutch and French, and often had to employ poetic reproduction. Her own poetry debut came in 1970 with Av hav er du komen. She chaired the Norwegian branch of International PEN for many years, and was a member of the Arts Council Norway. She was also a member of the Norwegian Cultural Council and Authors Association Literary Council.

Åse-Marie Nesse received many awards and badges of honor during her career. She was decorated with the Federal Cross of Merit in 1993 and the Royal Norwegian Order of St. Olav (Knight First Class) in 2001. She died in 2001 from cancer.

Awards
Bastianprisen (1967)
Sarpsborgprisen (1976) 
Sunnmørsprisen (1978)
Stavanger Aftenblads kulturpris (1981)
Ønskediktprisen (1981)
Klepp kommunes kulturpris (1992) 
 Den tyske æresordenen Bundesverdienstkreuz (1993)
 Førstepremie i konkurranse om gjendikting av Shakespeare-sonett (1998)
 Bokklubbenes skjønnlitterære oversetterpris (1999)
Doblougprisen (1999) 
Nynorsk litteraturpris (2000)

References

External links
Dagbladet profile
Norwegian Broadcasting (NRK) profile

1934 births
2001 deaths
People from Klepp
University of Oslo alumni
Academic staff of the University of Oslo
Germanists
Norwegian philologists
Women philologists
20th-century Norwegian poets
Translators from Dutch
Translators from German
Translators from Spanish
Translators from French
Nynorsk
Recipients of the Cross of the Order of Merit of the Federal Republic of Germany
Dobloug Prize winners
Norwegian women academics
Norwegian women poets
20th-century Norwegian women writers
20th-century Norwegian translators
20th-century philologists